This page lists all described genera and species of the spider family Segestriidae. , the World Spider Catalog accepts 142 species in 5 genera:

Ariadna

Ariadna Audouin, 1826
Ariadna abbreviata Marsh, Stevens & Framenau, 2022 – Tasmania
Ariadna abrilae Grismado, 2008 – Chile
Ariadna algarvensis Wunderlich, 2011 – Portugal
Ariadna alta Marsh, Stevens & Framenau, 2022 – Tasmania
Ariadna amabilia Marsh, Stevens & Framenau, 2022 – Tasmania
Ariadna araucana Grismado, 2008 – Chile
Ariadna arenacea (Marsh, Stevens, Bradford & Framenau, 2022) – Australia (South Australia)
Ariadna arthuri Petrunkevitch, 1926 – USA, Caribbean
Ariadna aurea Giroti & Brescovit, 2018 – Brazil
Ariadna barbigera Simon, 1905 – Chatham Islands
Ariadna bellatoria Dalmas, 1917 – New Zealand
Ariadna bellatula (Marsh, Stevens, Bradford & Framenau, 2022) – Australia (South Australia)
Ariadna bicolor (Hentz, 1842) – USA, Mexico
Ariadna bilineata Purcell, 1904 – South Africa
Ariadna boesenbergi Keyserling, 1877 – Brazil, Uruguay, Argentina
Ariadna boliviana Simon, 1907 – Bolivia, Suriname, Brazil, Paraguay
Ariadna brevispina Caporiacco, 1947 – Tanzania
Ariadna brignolii Wunderlich, 2011 – Italy
Ariadna burchelli (Hogg, 1900) – Victoria
Ariadna caerulea Keyserling, 1877 – Colombia, Ecuador
Ariadna calilegua Grismado, 2008 – Argentina
Ariadna canariensis Wunderlich, 1995 – Canary Islands
Ariadna caparao Giroti & Brescovit, 2018 – Brazil
Ariadna capensis Purcell, 1904 – South Africa
Ariadna cephalotes Simon, 1907 – Peru, Bolivia, Argentina
Ariadna changellkuk Grismado, 2008 – Chile
Ariadna chayu (Wang & Zhang, 2022) – China
Ariadna chhotae Siliwal & Yadav, 2017 – India
Ariadna clavata Marsh, Baehr, Glatz & Framenau, 2018 – South Australia
Ariadna comata O. Pickard-Cambridge, 1898 – Mexico
Ariadna corticola Lawrence, 1952 – South Africa
Ariadna crassipalpa (Blackwall, 1863) – Brazil
Ariadna crypticola Marsh, Stevens & Framenau, 2022 – Tasmania
Ariadna curvata (Marsh, Stevens, Bradford & Framenau, 2022) – Australia (South Australia)
Ariadna cyprusensis Wunderlich, 2011 – Cyprus, Kos
Ariadna daweiensis Yin, Xu & Bao, 2002 – China
Ariadna decatetracantha Main, 1954 – Western Australia
Ariadna dentigera Purcell, 1904 – South Africa
Ariadna deserta (Marsh, Stevens, Bradford & Framenau, 2022) – Australia (South Australia)
Ariadna dissimilis Berland, 1924 – New Caledonia
Ariadna diucrura (Marsh, Stevens, Bradford & Framenau, 2022) – Australia (South Australia)
Ariadna dysderina L. Koch, 1873 – Queensland
Ariadna elaphra Wang, 1993 – China
Ariadna europaensis Wunderlich, 2011 – Italy
Ariadna exuviaque Wunderlich, 2011 – Mallorca
Ariadna ferrogrisea Marsh, Stevens & Framenau, 2022 – Tasmania
Ariadna flavescens (Marsh, Stevens, Bradford & Framenau, 2022) – Australia (South Australia)
Ariadna formosa (Marsh, Stevens, Bradford & Framenau, 2022) – Australia (South Australia)
Ariadna fragilis Marsh, Stevens & Framenau, 2022 – Tasmania
Ariadna gallica Wunderlich, 2012 – France
Ariadna gaucha Giroti & Brescovit, 2018 – Brazil
Ariadna gonzo Marsh, Stevens & Framenau, 2022 – Tasmania
Ariadna gryllotalpa (Purcell, 1904) – South Africa
Ariadna hottentotta Purcell, 1908 – South Africa
Ariadna inflata (Marsh, Stevens, Bradford & Framenau, 2022) – Australia (South Australia)
Ariadna inops Wunderlich, 2011 – Portugal
Ariadna insidiatrix Audouin, 1826 – Mediterranean
Ariadna insula (Marsh, Stevens, Bradford & Framenau, 2022) – Australia (South Australia)
Ariadna insularis Purcell, 1908 – South Africa
Ariadna insulicola Yaginuma, 1967 – China, Korea, Japan
Ariadna ionica O. Pickard-Cambridge, 1873 – Greece
Ariadna ipojuca Giroti & Brescovit, 2018 – Brazil
Ariadna isthmica Beatty, 1970 – Costa Rica, Nicaragua, Panama, Brazil
Ariadna javana Kulczyński, 1911 – Java
Ariadna jiuzhaigou (Wang & Zhang, 2022) – China
Ariadna jubata Purcell, 1904 – South Africa
Ariadna karrooica Purcell, 1904 – South Africa
Ariadna kibonotensis Tullgren, 1910 – Tanzania
Ariadna kisanganensis Benoit, 1974 – Congo
Ariadna kiwirrkurra Baehr & Whyte, 2016 – Western Australia
Ariadna kolbei Purcell, 1904 – South Africa
Ariadna laeta Thorell, 1899 – Cameroon, Príncipe
Ariadna lalen Giroti & Brescovit, 2018 – Chile
Ariadna lateralis Karsch, 1881 – China, Korea, Taiwan, Japan
Ariadna lebronneci Berland, 1933 – Marquesas Islands
Ariadna lemosi Giroti & Brescovit, 2018 – Brazil
Ariadna levii Grismado, 2008 – Chile
Ariadna levyi Wunderlich, 2011 – Israel
Ariadna lightfooti Purcell, 1904 – South Africa
Ariadna maderiana Warburton, 1892 – Madeira, Salvages
Ariadna major Hickman, 1929 – Tasmania
Ariadna maroccana Wunderlich, 2011 – Morocco
Ariadna masculina Lawrence, 1928 – Namibia
Ariadna maxima (Nicolet, 1849) – Chile, Argentina, Juan Fernandez Is.
Ariadna mbalensis Lessert, 1933 – Angola
Ariadna meruensis Tullgren, 1910 – Tanzania
Ariadna mollis (Holmberg, 1876) – Brazil, Uruguay, Argentina
Ariadna molur Siliwal & Yadav, 2017 – India
Ariadna montana Rainbow, 1920 – Lord Howe Islands
Ariadna monticola Thorell, 1897 – Myanmar
Ariadna motumotirohiva Giroti, Cotoras, Lazo & Brescovit, 2020 – Chile
Ariadna multispinosa Bryant, 1948 – Hispaniola
Ariadna muscosa Hickman, 1929 – Tasmania
Ariadna natalis Pocock, 1900 – South Africa, Christmas Islands
Ariadna nebulosa Simon, 1906 – India
Ariadna neocaledonica Berland, 1924 – New Caledonia
Ariadna obscura (Blackwall, 1858) – Peru, Brazil
Ariadna octospinata (Lamb, 1911) – Queensland
Ariadna oreades Simon, 1906 – Sri Lanka
Ariadna otwayensis (Marsh, Stevens, Bradford & Framenau, 2022) – Australia (Victoria)
Ariadna papuana Kulczyński, 1911 – New Guinea
Ariadna pectinella Strand, 1913 – Central Africa
Ariadna pelia Wang, 1993 – China
Ariadna perkinsi Simon, 1900 – Hawaii
Ariadna phantasma Marsh, Hudson & Framenau, 2021 – Western Australia
Ariadna pilifera O. Pickard-Cambridge, 1898 – USA, Mexico
Ariadna pollex (Marsh, Stevens, Bradford & Framenau, 2022) – Australia (South Australia)
Ariadna propria (Marsh, Stevens, Bradford & Framenau, 2022) – Australia (South Australia)
Ariadna pulchripes Purcell, 1908 – South Africa
Ariadna rapinatrix Thorell, 1899 – Cameroon, Príncipe
Ariadna reginae Giroti & Brescovit, 2018 – Mexico, Guatemala, Belize, Costa Rica
Ariadna rutila (Marsh, Stevens, Bradford & Framenau, 2022) – Australia (South Australia)
Ariadna ruwenzorica Strand, 1913 – Central Africa
Ariadna sansibarica Strand, 1907 – Zanzibar
Ariadna scabripes Purcell, 1904 – South Africa
Ariadna segestrioides Purcell, 1904 – South Africa
Ariadna segmentata Simon, 1893 – Tasmania
Ariadna septemcincta (Urquhart, 1891) – New Zealand
Ariadna similis Purcell, 1908 – South Africa
Ariadna simplex (Marsh, Stevens, Bradford & Framenau, 2022) – Australia (South Australia)
Ariadna sinuosa (Marsh, Stevens, Bradford & Framenau, 2022) – Australia (Victoria)
Ariadna snellemanni (van Hasselt, 1882) – Sumatra, Krakatau, Philippines
Ariadna spinosa (Marsh, Stevens, Bradford & Framenau, 2022) – Australia (South Australia)
Ariadna subnubila Marsh, Stevens & Framenau, 2022 – Tasmania
Ariadna subplana (Marsh, Stevens, Bradford & Framenau, 2022) – Australia (South Australia)
Ariadna tangara Marsh, Baehr, Glatz & Framenau, 2018 – South Australia
Ariadna taprobanica Simon, 1906 – Sri Lanka
Ariadna tarsalis Banks, 1902 – Peru, Ecuador
Ariadna thylacinus Marsh, Stevens & Framenau, 2022 – Tasmania
Ariadna thyrianthina Simon, 1908 – Western Australia
Ariadna tigrina Marsh, Stevens & Framenau, 2022 – Tasmania
Ariadna tovarensis Simon, 1893 – Venezuela
Ariadna tria (Marsh, Stevens, Bradford & Framenau, 2022) – Australia (Victoria)
Ariadna ubajara Giroti & Brescovit, 2018 – Brazil
Ariadna umbra (Marsh, Stevens, Bradford & Framenau, 2022) – Australia (South Australia)
Ariadna umtalica Purcell, 1904 – South Africa
Ariadna una (Marsh, Stevens, Bradford & Framenau, 2022) – Australia (South Australia)
Ariadna uncinata Tang, Li & Yang, 2019 – China
Ariadna ungua (Marsh, Stevens, Bradford & Framenau, 2022) – Australia (South Australia)
Ariadna ustulata Simon, 1898 – Seychelles
Ariadna valida (Marsh, Stevens, Bradford & Framenau, 2022) – Australia (South Australia)
Ariadna vansda Siliwal, Yadav & Kumar, 2017 – India
Ariadna weaveri Beatty, 1970 – Mexico
Ariadna woinarskii (Marsh, Stevens, Bradford & Framenau, 2022) – Australia (South Australia)
Ariadna yintiaoling (Wang & Zhang, 2022) – China

Citharoceps

Citharoceps Chamberlin, 1924
 Citharoceps cruzana (Chamberlin & Ivie, 1935) — USA
 Citharoceps fidicina Chamberlin, 1924 (type) — USA, Mexico

Gippsicola

Gippsicola Hogg, 1900
 Gippsicola lineata Giroti & Brescovit, 2017 — Australia (Queensland)
 Gippsicola minuta Giroti & Brescovit, 2017 — Australia (Queensland)
 Gippsicola raleighi Hogg, 1900 (type) — Australia (Western, South, Victoria)
 Gippsicola robusta Giroti & Brescovit, 2017 — Australia (Queensland, New South Wales)

Indoseges 
Indoseges Siliwal, Das, Choudhury & Giroti, 2021

 Indoseges chilika Siliwal, Das, Choudhury & Giroti, 2021 — India
 Indoseges malkangiri Choudhury, Siliwal, Das & Giroti, 2021 (type) — India
 Indoseges narayani Choudhury, Siliwal, Das & Giroti, 2021 — India
 Indoseges satkosia Das, Siliwal, Choudhury & Giroti, 2021 — India
 Indoseges sushildutta Siliwal, Das, Choudhury, & Giroti, 2021 — India

Segestria

Segestria Latreille, 1804
 Segestria bavarica C. L. Koch, 1843 — Europe to Azerbaijan
 Segestria bella Chamberlin & Ivie, 1935 — USA
 Segestria cavernicola Kulczyński, 1915 — Italy
 Segestria croatica Doleschall, 1852 — Croatia
 Segestria danzantica Chamberlin, 1924 — Mexico
 Segestria davidi Simon, 1884 — Syria
 Segestria fengi (Fomichev & Marusik, 2020) — China
 Segestria florentina (Rossi, 1790) (type) — Europe to Georgia. Introduced to Brazil, Uruguay, Argentina
 Segestria fusca Simon, 1882 — Portugal, Spain, France, Italy
 Segestria inda Simon, 1906 — India
 Segestria madagascarensis Keyserling, 1877 — Madagascar
 Segestria mirshamsii Marusik & Omelko, 2014 — Iran
 Segestria nekhaevae Fomichev & Marusik, 2020 — Tajikistan
 Segestria nipponica Kishida, 1913 — Japan
 Segestria pacifica Banks, 1891 — USA
 Segestria pusiola Simon, 1882 — Spain, France (Corsica), Algeria
 Segestria saeva Walckenaer, 1837 — New Zealand
 Segestria sbordonii Brignoli, 1984 — Greece (Crete)
 Segestria senoculata (Linnaeus, 1758) — Europe, Turkey, Caucasus, Iran, Japan
 Segestria senoculata castrodunensis Gétaz, 1889 — Switzerland
 Segestria shtoppelae Fomichev & Marusik, 2020 — Kazakhstan
 Segestria turkestanica Dunin, 1986 — Central Asia

References

Segestriidae
Segestriidae